Karuna Nundy is an Indian lawyer at the Supreme Court of India and the focus of her work is on constitutional law, commercial litigation and arbitration, media law and legal policy.

Background 
Nundy was born in Bhopal, India.  She went to school at Sardar Patel Vidyalaya in Delhi. Nundy grew up with a desire to serve her community and nation through her skills.  Growing up, her parents also actively committed themselves to government and community service.  Her father worked at Harvard Medical School, but left to work at AIIMS and work in a public hospital in India.  Her mother, after learning that Nundy's cousin was born of cerebral palsy,  started the Spastics Society of Northern India.

Education
She received a degree in economics from St. Stephen's College, Delhi University. After a short stint as a TV journalist she studied law at Cambridge University , where she was awarded the Emmeline Pankhurst Prize, the Amy Cohen Awards and the Becker Studentship  and later pursued LL.M. from Columbia University, New York where she was awarded the prestigious Human Rights Fellowship.

Career 
Nundy worked as a lawyer in United Nations. In 2016, she represented Jeeja Ghosh in case against SpiceJet Airlines. Ms. Ghosh had cerebral palsy and had boarded a flight from Kolkata to Goa.  She was asked by airline staff to disembark the flight claiming she didn't look well and they didn't want her condition to deteriorate. She was humiliated. She pursued a case against the airline in the Supreme Court and urged airlines to treat differently abled travelers.  The Supreme Court ruled in her favor and ordered airline to pay Rs 10 lakh to her and for all air carriers to train their staff on needs and treatment of such passengers.

Nundy describes her relationship with her clients as her equals. “My clients are always partners in my cases.”  “It’s not the kind of situation where people come and give me their problem, and I say, OK, go. Let us just deal with it. The client always knows the most about the case. They also know what they need and want, and what they don’t.”

For Nundy, her career as a lawyer is a source of inspiration and a calling for her. “I can’t imagine doing something else. I care about making a positive contribution to the world, and I care about remedying injustice. I really believe in the Constitution of India. It’s something that motivates me, as well as international rights.”

There are three things that matter to her: “I’m in it for meaning, money, and metamorphosis.”

Activism
  In 2019, the UK foreign office appointed the lawyer to a new panel of experts to develop legal frameworks to protect  freedom of the media across the globe.  She has also advised and worked on policy issues for the Nepal Interim Constitution, a workshop with the Senate of Pakistan, the Government of Bhutan, and legal reform in the Maldives with the Attorney General's Office and Chief Justice of the Maldives Supreme Court.  Nundy also participates in a UK panel to support media freedom led by Lord David Neurberger and Amal Clooney.

In an interview with SEEMA, she described her personal motivations, "“I can’t imagine doing something else. I care about making a positive contribution to the world, and I care about remedying injustice. I really believe in the Constitution of India. It’s something that motivates me, as well as international rights.”  On fighting for civil rights, "I’m a great believer in deliberative democracy; where you speak, but you also listen. You come through the other side with differences intact, but you also come through together in important ways."

She also moved back to India to work on social justice issues in her mother country. “I was thinking, how can this happen in my country." “I really felt the call, and I am very unashamedly patriotic. I really love this country. I’m of this land and I love the culture and people.”

On her strategy on choosing cases, she selects them based legal theory and her personal passion for the cause and the case.  “When a particular case comes to me, I look at a number of things,” she says. “One is how much do I care. I do the care test. Caring has a large impact on how complicated and good the case is going to be. It’s a good petitioner. Sometimes the ideal petitioner is whether you can find a good legal theory to win.  But honestly, sometimes there’s a case that doesn’t have a hope in hell, but you do it anyway. That teaches you a lot about persistence and the value of resistance. You know the value of keeping something alive, even when you are against the biggest corporate governmental Nexus there is in the world.”

Accomplishments 
In November 2019, she also met German Chancellor, Angela Merkel, during her 2-day visit to India.  Nundy was included by an Economic Times jury in a list of 'Corporate India's Fastest Rising Women Leaders' which cited her as being 'famous in the corporate world for her expertise in commercial law'.  In 2020, Forbes Magazine named her on their list of "Self Made Women 2020."  Forbes Magazine also called her a “Mind that Matters” and Mint described her as the “Agent of Change.”

Nundy enjoys songwriting as a hobby saying, "“I wrote a jazz song for my father’s 80th birthday. It was interesting because my father’s positive qualities are quite traditional. The song was partly about that, and partly about him raising me to be a free and strong woman.”

References 

1976 births
Living people
Indian women's rights activists
Columbia Law School alumni
Alumni of the University of Cambridge
St. Stephen's College, Delhi alumni
20th-century Indian lawyers
20th-century Indian women lawyers
21st-century Indian lawyers
21st-century Indian women lawyers